Mohammad Reza Azadi (born 7 September 1999) is an Iranian professional footballer who plays as a centre-forward for Persian Gulf Pro League club Aluminium Arak.

Club career
Azadi joined Tractor S.C. 2017 after spending the previous season in Panetolikos F.C..

He joined Panetolikos on 24 October 2020, becoming the fourth Iranian player in Super League Greece.‌

Career statistics

Club

Honours 

Tractor
Hazfi Cup (1): 2019–20

References
2. حاج صفی نه آزادی به یونان رفت  Retrieved varzesh3.com (in Persian).

3. آزادی در میان قناری ها محمدرضا جایگزین یک بازیکن فلسطینی شد Retrieved irna.ir (in Persian).

4. محمد رضا آزادی به پانتلیکوس یونان پیوست Retrieved khabarvarzeshi.com (in Persian).

5. Biography Mohammad Reza Azadi Retrieved  (in Persian).

6. آزادی: پدر و مادرم اذیت شدند، تصمیم به جدایی گرفتم/ به تیمی می‌روم که پیشرفت کنم Retrieved tasnimnews.com (in Persian).

7. گل اول تراکتور به استقلال توسط محمدرضا آزادی/ ویدیو Retrieved  medal1.com (in Persian). ۱

8. Panetolikos completes signing of Iranian forward Azadi Retrieved tahrantimes.com (in Persian). 23 October 2020

9. Mohammad Reza Azadi Joins Panetolikos  Retrieved tasnimnews.com (in Persian). 24 October 2020

10. Rising IR Iran star Azadi joins Greek side Panetolikos  Retrieved the-afc.com 24 October 2020

11. مهاجم تراکتور وارد فوتبال اروپا شد Retrieved Pana.ir (in Persian).

12. مهاجم تراکتور لژیونر شد/آزادی به پانتلیکوس یونان پیوست Retrieved (in Persian). khabarban.com

13. مهاجم تراکتور به یک تیم یونانی پیوست Retrieved mehrnews.com (in Persian).

14. هفته نهم لیگ برتر فوتبال|جشنواره گل استقلال در تبریز با هت‌تریک دیاباته/طلسم 8 ساله شکست  Retrieved farsnews.ir (in Persian).

15. Tractor vs. Esteghlal Retrieved int.soccerway.com

16. Mohammad Reza Azadi Retrieved joined Panetolikos with an official contract. Source: Panetolikos Club's home page on Instagram

1999 births
Living people
People from Naqadeh
Iranian footballers
Association football forwards
Iran youth international footballers
Tractor S.C. players
Panetolikos F.C. players
Esteghlal F.C. players
Persian Gulf Pro League players
Super League Greece players
Footballers at the 2018 Asian Games
Asian Games competitors for Iran
Iranian expatriate footballers
Expatriate footballers in Greece
Iranian expatriate sportspeople in Greece